National Highway 415  (NH 415) starts from Banderdewa, Arunachal Pradesh and ends at Gohpur, Assam.

See also
 List of National Highways in India (by Highway Number)
 List of National Highways in India
 National Highways Development Project

References

External links
  NH network map of India

415
415
National highways in India
Transport in Itanagar